Elena Milovanović (born 31 January 2001) is a Serbian tennis player.

Milovanović has career-high WTA rankings of No. 720 in singles, achieved on 12 September 2022 and No. 680 in doubles, achieved on 7 November 2022. She has won six doubles titles on the ITF Women's Circuit.

Milovanović was born in Kraljevo, started playing tennis at the age of eight and resides in Čačak.

She won Serbian national team championships with TC Novak for three years in a row, from 2020 to 2022.

Milovanović competes for Serbia in the Billie Jean King Cup, where she has a win-loss record of 0–1.

ITF Circuit finals

Singles: 1 (runner-up)

Doubles: 14 (6 titles, 8 runner-ups)

References

External links
 
 
 

2001 births
Living people
Sportspeople from Čačak
Sportspeople from Kraljevo
Serbian female tennis players